Kozie Góry is nature reserve in Lubartów County, Lublin Voivodeship in Poland.

Nature reserves in Poland
Geography of Lublin Voivodeship